Heron Lake is a lake in Jackson County, in the U.S. state of Minnesota.

Heron Lake is the English translation of the native Dakota language name, Okabena, meaning place where the heron nest.

See also
List of lakes in Minnesota

References

Lakes of Minnesota
Lakes of Jackson County, Minnesota